Robert Kidiaba Muteba (born 1 February 1976) is a Congolese politician and former professional footballer who played as a goalkeeper. He spent most of his club career with TP Mazembe, whilst at international level he collected 61 caps playing for the DR Congo national team.

Club career
Born in Lubumbashi, Kidiaba played club football for AS Saint-Luc and TP Mazembe. He played five games for TP Mazembe in the 2010 FIFA Club World Cup.

International career
Kidiaba made his international debut for the DR Congo national team in 2002, and has appeared for them in 11 FIFA World Cup qualifying matches. In December 2014 he announced he would retire from international duty after the 2015 Africa Cup of Nations, in January 2015 he was named in the 23-man squad for the tournament, and in February 2015 he indicated that he might not retire after the tournament.

Political career
In May 2015 it was announced that Kidiaba and teammate Jean Kasusula would stand for the National Party for Democracy and Development at forthcoming elections.

He was elected a Member of Parliament for Upper Katanga Province in January 2019.

Personal life
Kidiaba works as an ambassador for the Peace One Day charity.

He is married and has three children.

He is "famed for the 'bum shuffle' goal celebration" which consists of "bouncing around his penalty area on his backside." The move is a fan favourite.

Honours
DR Congo
Africa Cup of Nations bronze: 2015

References

1976 births
Living people
People from Lubumbashi
Democratic Republic of the Congo footballers
Democratic Republic of the Congo international footballers
Association football goalkeepers
TP Mazembe players
2004 African Cup of Nations players
2011 African Nations Championship players
2013 Africa Cup of Nations players
2015 Africa Cup of Nations players
Democratic Republic of the Congo politicians
Democratic Republic of the Congo A' international footballers
2009 African Nations Championship players